Khaled Houcine (born 19 July 1990, Doha) is a Tunisian sprint canoeist. At the 2012 Summer Olympics, he competed in the Men's C-1 200 metres.  He competed at the same event at the 2016 Summer Olympics.

References

Tunisian male canoeists
Living people
Olympic canoeists of Tunisia
Canoeists at the 2012 Summer Olympics
Canoeists at the 2016 Summer Olympics
1990 births
21st-century Tunisian people